The Luzzago Altarpiece is a 1542 oil on canvas painting by Moretto da Brescia, now in the Pinacoteca Tosio Martinengo in Brescia. It was recorded in San Giuseppe church in Brescia in 1630 and moved to its present home in 1868. In the lower register Michael the Archangel points the kneeling donor to the Madonna and Child above, whilst Francis of Assisi stands to the right with a cross.

References

Bibliography
 Giulio Antonio Averoldi, Le scelte pitture di Brescia additate al forestiere, Brescia 1700
 Paolo Brognoli, Nuova Guida di Brescia, Brescia 1826
Joseph Archer Crowe, Giovanni Battista Cavalcaselle, A history of painting in North Italy, Londra 1871
 Bernardino Faino, Catalogo Delle Chiese riuerite in Brescia, et delle Pitture et Scolture memorabili, che si uedono in esse in questi tempi, Brescia 1630
 Gustavo Frizzoni, La Pinacoteca comunale Martinengo in Brescia in "Archivio storico dell'arte", Brescia 1889
György Gombosi, Moretto da Brescia, Basel 1943
 Francesco Paglia, Il Giardino della Pittura, Brescia 1675
 Gaetano Panazza, I Civici Musei e la Pinacoteca di Brescia, Bergamo 1958
 Pier Virgilio Begni Redona, Alessandro Bonvicino - Il Moretto da Brescia, Editrice La Scuola, Brescia 1988
 Carlo Ridolfi, Le maraviglie dell'arte Ouero le vite de gl'illvstri pittori veneti, e dello stato. Oue sono raccolte le Opere insigni, i costumi, & i ritratti loro. Con la narratione delle Historie, delle Fauole, e delle Moralità da quelli dipinte, Brescia 1648

Paintings in the collection of the Pinacoteca Tosio Martinengo
Paintings by Moretto da Brescia
Paintings of the Madonna and Child by Moretto da Brescia
1542 paintings
Paintings of Francis of Assisi
Paintings depicting Michael (archangel)
Altarpieces